Reginald James Cushing Sutton (10 May 1909 – 31 July 1994) was an English freestyle swimmer and water polo player who competed for Great Britain in the 1928 Summer Olympics, in the 1932 Summer Olympics, and in the 1936 Summer Olympics.

He was born in London.

In 1928 he finished sixth with the British team in the 4×200 metre freestyle relay event. In the 100 metre freestyle competition he was eliminated in the first round.

Four years later he was a member of the British team which finished fifth with the British team in the 4×200 metre freestyle relay contest at the 1932 Games. He also swam in the 100 metre freestyle event but was eliminated in the first round again.

He was part of the British water polo team which finished eighth in the 1936 tournament. He played all seven matches.

At the 1934 Empire Games he was a member of the English team which won the silver medal in the 4×200 yards freestyle competition.

See also
 List of Commonwealth Games medallists in swimming (men)

External links
British Olympic Association athlete profile
sports-reference.com

1909 births
1994 deaths
English male freestyle swimmers
English male water polo players
Olympic swimmers of Great Britain
Olympic water polo players of Great Britain
Swimmers at the 1928 Summer Olympics
Swimmers at the 1932 Summer Olympics
Water polo players at the 1936 Summer Olympics
Swimmers at the 1934 British Empire Games
Commonwealth Games silver medallists for England
Commonwealth Games medallists in swimming
Medallists at the 1934 British Empire Games